Parallel processing may refer to:
Parallel computing
Parallel processing (DSP implementation) – Parallel processing in digital signal processing
Parallel processing (psychology)
Parallel process – client/supervisor